Interplay Entertainment Corp. is an American video game developer and publisher based in Los Angeles. The company was founded in 1983 as Interplay Productions by developers Brian Fargo, Jay Patel, Troy Worrell, and Rebecca Heineman, as well as investor Chris Wells. As a developer, Interplay is best known as the creator of the Fallout series and as a publisher for the Baldur's Gate and Descent series.

History

Interplay Productions 

Prior to Interplay, the company's founding developers—Brian Fargo, Troy Worrell, Jay Patel, and Rebecca Heineman—worked for Boone Corporation, a video game developer based in California. When Boone eventually folded, the four got together with investor Chris Wells and, believing they could create a company that was better than Boone, founded Interplay in October 1983. The first projects were non-original and consisted of software conversions and even some military work for Loral Corporation. After negotiations with Activision, Interplay entered a US$100,000 contract to produce three illustrated text adventures for them. Published in 1984, Mindshadow is loosely based on Robert Ludlum's Bourne Identity while The Tracer Sanction puts the player in the role of an interplanetary secret agent. Borrowed Time which features a script by Arnie Katz' Subway Software followed in 1985. These adventures built upon work previously done by Fargo: his first game was the 1981-published Demon's Forge.

The same year, Interplay Productions, then contracted out by Electronic Arts, ported EA's Racing Destruction Set to the Atari 8-bit family of computers. The conversion, entirely coded by Rebecca Heineman, was released in 1986 via Electronic Arts for the United States and Ariolasoft for the European market.

Interplay's parser was developed by Fargo and an associate and in one version understands about 250 nouns and 200 verbs as well as prepositions and indirect objects. In 1986, Tass Times in Tonetown followed. Interplay made a name for itself as a quality developer of role-playing video games with the three-part series The Bard's Tale (1985–1988), critically acclaimed Wasteland (1988) and Dragon Wars (1989). All of them were published by Electronic Arts.

Interplay started publishing its own games, beginning with Neuromancer and Battle Chess, in 1988, and then moved on to publish and distribute games from other companies, while continuing internal game development. In 1995, Interplay published the hit game Descent, developed by startup Parallax Software. Interplay published several Star Trek video games, including Star Trek: 25th Anniversary for computers and for Nintendo Entertainment System and Star Trek: Judgment Rites. These games had later CD-ROM editions released with the original Star Trek cast providing voices. Interplay also published Starfleet Academy and Klingon Academy games, and Starfleet Command series, beginning with Star Trek: Starfleet Command. Another game, Star Trek: Secret of Vulcan Fury, was in development in the late 1990s but was never completed and much of its staff laid off due to budgetary cuts prompted by various factors. In 1995, after several years of delays, Interplay finally published its role-playing game Stonekeep. Other PC games released during the mid- to late 1990s included Carmageddon, Fragile Allegiance, Hardwar and Redneck Rampage.

In 1997, Interplay developed and released Fallout, a successful and critically acclaimed role-playing video game set in a retro-futuristic post-apocalyptic setting. Black Isle Studios, a newly created in-house developer, followed with the sequel, Fallout 2, in 1998. Another successful subsequent Interplay franchise was Baldur's Gate, a Dungeons & Dragons game that was developed by BioWare and which spawned a successful expansion, sequel and spin-off series. The spin-off series started with Baldur's Gate: Dark Alliance; the game's success forged a sequel as well. Aside from Dark Alliance, Interplay published a few notable console series such as Loaded and the fighting game series ClayFighter and the games by Shiny Entertainment, MDK and Wild 9.

Interplay Entertainment 
By 1998, the financial situation at Interplay was dire and the company was in bankruptcy court. To avert bankruptcy, Interplay went public on the NASDAQ stock exchange under the name Interplay Entertainment.

Interplay continued to endure losses under Brian Fargo due to increased competition, less than stellar returns on Interplay's sports division and the lack of console titles. This forced Interplay to seek additional funding two years later with an investment from Titus Interactive, a Paris-based game company. Titus agreed to invest 25 million dollars in Interplay and a few months later this was followed up by an additional 10 million investment. Interplay also acquired a 49.9% ownership in publisher Virgin Interactive in February 1999. With this, Interplay would be able to distribute Virgin's games in North America, while Virgin would distribute Interplay's games in Europe.

By 2001, Titus Interactive completed its acquisition of majority control of Interplay. Immediately afterwards, they shed most of Interplay's publisher functions and signed a long-term agreement under which Vivendi Universal Games would distribute Interplay's games. Eventually, Interplay founder Brian Fargo departed at the start of 2002 to found InXile Entertainment as Fargo's plan to change Interplay's main focus from PC gaming to console gaming failed. Herve Caen took over the role of CEO to perform triage and made several unpopular but arguably necessary decisions to cancel various projects, in order to save the company. Interplay sold Shiny Entertainment to Infogrames and several game properties while closing BlueSky Software. Due to a low share price, Interplay's shares were delisted from the NASDAQ in 2002 and now trade on the over the counter (OTC) market. Interplay's European operations were completely sold to Titus Interactive, which included their share of Virgin Interactive, which Titus renamed to Avalon Interactive in August 2003. With this, Titus had complete control over publishing and distributing Interplay's games in Europe under the Avalon Interactive name.

On September 29, 2003, Interplay announced it had canceled its distribution deal with Vivendi Universal Games, due to Vivendi suing them for alleged breaches of the working agreement and failure of payment. On December 8, 2003, Interplay laid off the entire Black Isle Studios staff. The company was also involved in issues including debt. Feargus Urquhart later left Black Isle Studios and Interplay suffered a loss of US$20 million in that year.

In 2005, Titus Interactive, S.A. filed for bankruptcy and closed down all their assets parts of which Interplay acquired. The bankruptcy of Titus led to Interplay being burdened with debt. Interplay faced bankruptcy again and was brought to bankruptcy court in 2006. To pay off creditors, the company altered its licensing agreement with Bethesda Software and then sold the Fallout IP to Bethesda Softworks in 2007.

In September 2008, several games from Interplay's catalog were re-released on the digital distribution service GOG.com after being unavailable in retail distribution for years.

In August 2013, Interplay acquired the remaining rights to the FreeSpace franchise for $7,500 after THQ went to bankruptcy court.

In September 2016, Interplay announced its intent to sell off its intellectual property, composed of 70 games, working together with Wedbush Securities.

Interplay is co-publishing, with 3D Realms, a remaster of Xatrix Entertainment's 1999 game Kingpin: Life of Crime, which was originally published by Interplay. Known as Kingpin: Reloaded, the game will be developed by Slipgate Ironworks. This was announced on January 17, 2020.

In 2021 Interplay, via Black Isle Studios, re-released Baldur's Gate: Dark Alliance on modern consoles, and later that year also released a port of it on PC for the first time.

Litigation 
In 2003 and 2004 Snowblind Studios and Interplay Entertainment were engaged in a dispute regarding the Dark Alliance Engine for Fallout: Brotherhood of Steel, Baldur's Gate: Dark Alliance II, and the GameCube version of the original Dark Alliance. The dispute was resolved and Interplay would be allowed to work with materials already using the Dark Alliance Engine.

Bethesda Softworks sued Interplay in 2009, regarding the Fallout Online license and selling of Fallout Trilogy and sought an injunction to stop development of Fallout Online and sales of Fallout Trilogy. After several trials spanning almost three years, and in exchange for $2 million dollars, Interplay gave Bethesda the full rights for Fallout Online. Interplay's rights to sell and merchandise Fallout, Fallout 2, and Fallout Tactics: Brotherhood of Steel expired on December 31, 2013.

In 2010, TopWare Interactive revealed that they were developing Battle vs. Chess to be published by SouthPeak Games. Interplay sued them and won an injunction to stop sales in the United States. In 2012, Interplay won the case via default and a settlement for $200,000 plus interest was agreed upon on November 15, 2012.

Games

Studios 
 Interplay Discovery; a subdivision founded in 2010 aimed at publishing games made by independent video game developers.
 Black Isle Studios in Orange County, California, started in 1996.

Defunct studios 
 14 Degrees East, the strategy division of Interplay, located in Beverly Hills and founded in 1999.
 BlueSky Software in California, started in 1988, closed in 2001.
 Brainstorm in Irvine, California.
 Digital Mayhem, an Interplay development studio that ported Giants: Citizen Kabuto to the PS2 and developed Run Like Hell.
 FlatCat
 Interplay Films, a division of Interplay Entertainment, was formed in 1998 and was supposed to develop seven of the company's most popular video game titles into movies, including Descent, Redneck Rampage, and Fallout. Its president was Tom Reed.
 Interplay Sports located in Beverly Hills was the internal sports division at Interplay. The division was founded in 1995 as VR Sports, but changed its name in 1998.
 MacPlay, ported games to Mac OS from 1990–1997. The brand was licensed to United Developers, LLC in 2000.
 Shiny Entertainment in Laguna Beach, California, founded in 1993, acquired in 1995, sold to Atari in 2002. It later merged with The Collective to form Double Helix Games in 2007.
 Tantrum Entertainment, developer of NHRA Drag Racing
 Tribal Dreams, a developer that had only finished one game, Of Light and Darkness. They were shutdown in late 1998 in conjunction with the cancelled adventure game Star Trek: Secret of Vulcan Fury.

References

External links 
 

 
1983 establishments in California
American companies established in 1983
Brentwood, Los Angeles
Companies based in Los Angeles
Companies traded over-the-counter in the United States
Video game companies based in California
Video game companies established in 1983
Video game development companies
Video game publishers